Feral pigeons (Columba livia domestica or Columba livia forma urbana), also called city doves, city pigeons, or street pigeons, are descendants of domestic pigeons (Columba livia domestica) that have returned to the wild. The domestic pigeon was originally bred from the wild rock dove, which naturally inhabits sea-cliffs and mountains. Rock, domestic, and feral pigeons are all the same species and will readily interbreed. Feral pigeons find the ledges of buildings to be a substitute for sea cliffs, have become adapted to urban life, and are abundant in towns and cities throughout much of the world.

Owing to their capacity to create large amounts of excrement and be an occasional disease vector to humans combined with crop and property damage, pigeons are largely considered a nuisance and an invasive species, often disparagingly referred to as "rats with wings". Actions are taken in many municipalities to lower their numbers or completely eradicate them.

Physical characteristics

Feral pigeons are essentially the same size and shape as the original wild rock dove, but often display far greater variation in colour and pattern than their wild ancestors. The blue-barred pattern which the original wild rock dove displays is generally less common in more urban areas. Urban pigeons tend to have darker plumage than those in more rural areas.

Protection status

In the U.K., pigeons are covered under the "General Licences" and can be humanely culled by the land owner or their agent for a variety of reasons (mainly crop protection). It is illegal to kill/destroy nests for any reason other than those listed under the general licences.

In the U.S., the Migratory Bird Treaty Act of 1918, which protects native birds, does not apply to feral pigeons, common starlings or house sparrows, because they are introduced species. It is usually legal to kill feral pigeons in the United States; methods such as poisons may be regulated, however.

In India, pigeons are protected under Section 428 and Section 429 of the Indian Penal Code. Wild pigeons are further protected under the Wildlife Protection Act, 1972.

Population control

Feral pigeons often only have small populations within cities relative to the number of humans. For example, the breeding population of feral pigeons in Sheffield, England in summer 2005 was estimated at 12,130 individuals (95% confidence interval 7757–18,970), in a city with a human population of about 500,000. Despite this, feral pigeons usually reach their highest densities in the central portions of cities, so they are frequently encountered by people, which may lead to conflict.

Potential health risk to humans 
Feral pigeons are widely considered pests, and are famous for being reservoirs and vectors of multiple human and livestock diseases. However, It is rare that a pigeon will transmit a disease to humans due to their immune system. Although feral pigeons pose sporadic health risks to humans, the risk is very low, even for humans involved in occupations that bring them into close contact with nesting sites.

Property damage 

Pigeons often cause significant pollution with their droppings, though there is little evidence of them driving out other bird species. Pigeons are labeled an invasive species in North America by the USDA.

Predators
Peregrine falcons, which are also originally cliff dwellers, have also adapted to the skyscrapers of large cities and often feed exclusively on rock doves. Some cities actively encourage this through falcon breeding programs. Projects include the Unibase Falcon Project and the Victorian Peregrine Project.

Other predators of the pigeon have been recorded, including Eurasian sparrowhawks, crows and gulls. In London, the population of Great white pelicans at St. James's Park have also been recorded killing and consuming pigeons despite alternative food sources being available. In cities in Western Europe, European herring gulls may occasionally hunt and consume feral pigeons in addition to other birds and small mammals.

Larger birds of prey occasionally take advantage of this population as well. In New York City, the abundance of feral pigeons (and other small animals) has created such a conducive environment for predators that the red-tailed hawk has begun to return in very small numbers, including the notable Pale Male.

Poison
Due to their non-selective nature, most avian poisons have been banned. In the United States market, only 4-aminopyridine (Avitrol) and DRC-1339 remain registered by EPA. DRC-1339 is limited to USDA use only, while 4-AP is a restricted-use pesticide, for use only by licensed applicators.

The use of poisons has been proven to be fairly ineffective, however, as pigeons can breed very quickly, and their numbers are determined by how much food is available; that is, they breed more often when more food is provided to them. When pigeons are poisoned, surviving birds do not leave the area. On the contrary, they are left with more food per bird than before. This attracts pigeons from outside areas as well as encouraging more breeding, and populations are re-established quickly. An additional problem with poisoning is that it also kills pigeon predators. Due to this, in cities with peregrine falcon programs it is typically illegal to poison pigeons.

Reducing food supply

A more effective tactic to reduce the number of feral pigeons is deprivation. Cities around the world have discovered that not feeding their local birds results in a steady population decrease in only a few years. As scavengers, pigeons will still pick at garbage bags containing discarded food or at leftovers carelessly dropped on the ground, but securely disposing of foodstuffs will greatly reduce scavenger populations. Feeding of pigeons is banned in parts of Venice, Italy.

Long-term reduction of feral pigeon populations can be achieved by restricting food supply, which in turn involves legislation and litter (garbage) control. Some cities have deliberately established favorable nesting places for pigeons—nesting places that can easily be reached by city workers who regularly remove eggs, thereby limiting their reproductive success. In addition, pigeon populations may be reduced by bird control systems that successfully reduce nesting sites.

Avian contraceptives

In 1998, in response to conservation groups and the public interest, the National Wildlife Research Center (NWRC), a USDA/APHIS laboratory in Fort Collins, Colorado, started work on nicarbazin, a promising compound for avian contraception. Originally developed for use in resident Canada geese, nicarbazin was introduced for use as a contraceptive for feral pigeons in 2007.

The active ingredient, nicarbazin, interferes with the viability of eggs by binding the ZP-3 sperm receptor site in the egg. This unique contraceptive action is non-hormonal and fully reversible.

Registered by the EPA as a pesticide (EPA Reg. No. 80224-1), "OvoControl P", brand of nicarbazin, is increasingly used in urban areas and industrial sites to control pigeon populations. Declared safe and humane, the new technology is environmentally benign and does not represent a secondary toxicity hazard to raptors or scavengers.

Avian contraception has the support of a range of animal welfare groups including the Humane Society of the United States, the American Society for the Prevention of Cruelty to Animals and People for the Ethical Treatment of Animals. Avian contraceptives are also perceived by civilians as an acceptable method for population control, over other methods such as prohibition to feeding or extermination.

Dummy egg nesting

When eggs are removed in artificial pigeon houses, the interval between reproductive attempts is strongly reduced, which reduces the efficiency of the method. Dummy egg nesting programs have therefore been tested in some cities with mixed results. There, the eggs are removed and replaced with dummy eggs. The real eggs are then destroyed. One such structure, in Batman Park in Melbourne, Australia, was unsuccessful in attracting pigeons and has since been removed. The loft used in Melbourne was on stilts, with a cage door allowing access from beneath for accessing the structure at night when the pigeons are asleep.

Monitoring dove population 
Estimating the population size of pigeons is necessary for monitoring and control programs of pigeons in parks and other urban areas. The methods used for estimating populations sizes are:
 Stratified grids: This method consists in dividing the area where pigeons occur in 500x500m squares. 34% of the squares are selected randomly and pigeons are counted in a 5 meters radius for 5 minutes.
 Point-counts: standing in the center of a park, the observer makes a 360 degree turn while counting individuals with a manual mechanical counter in a radius of approximately 50m, limited by the streets and buildings that surround the park.
 Panoramas: taking 360 panoramic photographs, while standing at the center of the park, and using software to place a number above the counted pigeon in the panoramic photograph. This method has been proven the most effective of all.

City squares famous for pigeons
Many city squares have large pigeon populations, such as Washington Square Park in New York City, George Square in Glasgow, the Piazza San Marco in Venice, Dam Square in Amsterdam, The Gateway of India and Kabutarkhana in Mumbai and (prior to 2000) Trafalgar Square in London.

Sloan intended to "elevate the humble pigeon" with his work titled Pigeon. The mirrored stainless steel statue cost AU$174,000. While the installation has been talked up by City of Adelaide Lord Mayor Sandy Verschoor, some locals have responded negatively, at least one referring to it as abhorrent.

See also

 Bird feeding – typically thought of as an activity of bird enthusiasts, studies have revealed it may have both positive and negative impact
 Doves as symbols – appearing, usually white in color, in many settings as symbols of love, peace or as messengers, in the symbolism of various religions and of both military and pacifist groups
 Squab – a young pigeon, typically under four weeks old, or its meat

References

Books

External links
 
 Cornell Lab of Ornithology - Pigeon Colors

Articles containing video clips
Birds described in 1789
Birds of Canada
Birds of Europe
Birds of North America
Columba (genus)
Cosmopolitan birds
Domesticated birds
Feral animals
Introduced birds
Invasive bird species
Taxa named by Johann Friedrich Gmelin
Urban wildlife